The Trinity Episcopal Church at 248 N. Arthur Street in Pocatello, Idaho was built in 1897–1898, after the St. Joseph's Catholic Church.  The two churches are rare as stone churches in Idaho, and are both Gothic.

It was added to the National Register in 1978.

It has an L-shaped plan and stained glass windows from Wells Brothers in Chicago.  It has a -tall clapboard bell tower with spire.

It was designed by architect W. Y. Van Winkle of Hailey, reportedly designed after an English parish church in Lancashire, England.

References

Episcopal church buildings in Idaho
Churches on the National Register of Historic Places in Idaho
Gothic Revival church buildings in Idaho
Churches completed in 1897
Buildings and structures in Bannock County, Idaho
1897 establishments in Idaho
19th-century Episcopal church buildings
National Register of Historic Places in Bannock County, Idaho
Churches in Pocatello, Idaho